is a weapon-based fighting video game franchise by Bandai Namco Entertainment. 

There are seven main installments of video games and various media spin-offs, including music albums and a series of manga books. The first game in the series, Soul Edge (or Soul Blade outside Japan), was released as an arcade game in 1995 and was later ported to video game consoles; the widespread success of its first sequel Soulcalibur in 1998 led to Soulcalibur becoming the name of the franchise, with all subsequent installments also using the name. More recent games in the series have been released for consoles only and have evolved to include online playing modes.

The central motif of the series, set in a historical fantasy version of the late 16th and early 17th centuries, are mythical swords, the evil weapon called Soul Edge and the subsequent sword used to oppose this evil, Soul Calibur (parsed as two words, while the series' title is written as a single word). While it has developed during its various iterations, some of the characters and gameplay elements have remained consistent throughout the series.

Project Soul is the internal Namco development group responsible for the Soulcalibur franchise after the release of Soulcalibur II. Although the games are usually credited to Namco itself, the team established its name to draw attention to the group's combined accomplishments.

Games 

All games in the series before Soulcalibur III were originally released as arcade games, and subsequently ported to home consoles. The ported versions are known for their extra features, including characters, weapons, costumes, art galleries, martial arts demonstrations and involved single-player modes, when compared to the original arcade versions. For example, Seung Han Myong (Romanized in later games as Seong Han-myeong) is not featured in the arcade version of Soul Edge and in home versions there is a role-playing-type mode titled "Edge Master" where the player can unlock various items including weapons for the default characters.

Main series

Soul Edge 

The first installment, titled Soul Edge, was released for arcade, and was later updated to Soul Edge Ver. II. This enhanced version was then ported to the PlayStation, where it was renamed Soul Blade outside Japan. Set in the late sixteenth century, the game follows nine warriors in a quest, each of whom has their own reasons for joining the quest but they all share a common goal: to obtain the legendary sword, called 'Soul Edge'. After appearing in arcade, the game was made available for PlayStation in 1996. Along with its soundtrack, it has been praised for being innovative yet traditional to the fighting genre of games. With Versus (one-on-one battle mode), Survival (take on a gauntlet of opponents until the player is unable to continue), Time Attack, Team Battle (a selection of combatants will take on an opposing group, a victor is announced when the last remaining member of a team is defeated) and Training modes, the console port also saw the addition of Edge Master, a single-player mode in which the player would guide one of the ten main characters in a story-like manner while obtaining a variety of weapons for use.

Soulcalibur 

The sequel to Soul Edge was released for arcade a year later, with a port for the Dreamcast in 1999. The plot is set two–three years after the first game. The title is derived from Soul Calibur, a legendary weapon which opposes the evil of Soul Edge. Though retaining elements of its predecessor, Soulcalibur incorporated an extensive number of new features, including the "8-Way Run". The title Soulcalibur became a trademark title to be used throughout the series since. In 2008, Namco Bandai released Soulcalibur on the Xbox Live Arcade for the Xbox 360. Although online leaderboards and achievements were supported in this version, there was no online playing mode or mission mode, as there was in the Dreamcast version.

Soulcalibur II 

2002's Soulcalibur II further improved and expanded on the Soulcalibur original, in both graphics and gameplay. Soulcalibur II was released in arcade format three years after the previous release in the series, and was subsequently ported to all three active sixth-generation consoles. This is the first game in the Soulcalibur series to feature characters in other media, such as Link from Nintendo's The Legend of Zelda, playable on the GameCube. Featured on the PlayStation 2 version's roster is Heihachi Mishima of Tekken, while Image Comic's character Spawn was an addition for the Xbox version.

A high definition-optimized enhanced port of the game, entitled Soulcalibur II HD Online, was released in November 2013, and features revamped HD visuals, online play, and trophy/achievement support. It is a digital release and is available through Microsoft's Xbox Live Arcade and Sony's PlayStation Network digital storefronts. Being based on the original PlayStation 2 and Xbox releases, both ports include the two guest characters (Heihachi Mishima and Spawn) who were originally exclusive to each platform.

Soulcalibur III 

Breaking with tradition, the PlayStation 2 version of Soulcalibur III was released in 2005 before an Arcade Edition was seen. It used a different graphics engine. Soulcalibur III contains a new single-player mode called "Tales of Souls", a story mode in which the player can make course-altering decisions. Arenas are more interactive, for example with rocks breaking if a character were to impact against them. Soulcalibur III is the first game in the series to feature a character creation system, and features a story mode called "Chronicles of the Sword" which is a mode with some strategic aspects for created characters. It is the only game in the Soulcalibur series to be THX approved.

Soulcalibur IV 

Released in 2008 for the PlayStation 3 and Xbox 360, the fourth installment of the series is the second game with no arcade release prior to the release of the home game, as well as being the first to take bouts online and the last game to conclude the 1590 A.D. trilogy. Soulcalibur IV introduces new gameplay mechanics into the series in the form of damage-absorbing armor (that can be shattered) and Critical Finishes (both tied to the new Soul Gauge). Like Soulcalibur II, the fourth game also included cameos from different media. The Star Wars character Darth Vader is a playable character on the PlayStation 3 version, while Yoda is for the Xbox 360 version. Each character was also available for download on the consoles in which they do not appear. Both versions of the game include the Apprentice character from Star Wars: The Force Unleashed. Like Soulcalibur III, the game includes a character creation system with various customizable parts, some of which have to be unlocked. These characters can be taken into online bouts, which in itself is a new addition to the series. However, unlike Soulcalibur III, the only available weapon disciplines are taken from the existing roster and there are no unique disciplines for created characters.

Soulcalibur V 

Released in 2012 for the PlayStation 3 and Xbox 360, Soulcalibur V is the sixth installment of the series and the second game to take bouts online, as well as the last installment to conclude the original timeline story. Like the other Soulcalibur series, this game features guest characters; in this case Ezio Auditore da Firenze from the Assassin's Creed series and as well as the fighting style of Devil Jin from the Tekken series.

Soulcalibur VI 

Soulcalibur VI was released in 2018. While the storyline takes place after the fifth game, it act as a soft reboot, taking the series back to mostly reimagined after Soul Edge and eventually set in a new timeline. Like Tekken 7, it uses Unreal Engine 4, and features downloadable guests, while one guest character (Geralt of Rivia from The Witcher series) acts as one of the base roster and plays a vital role on the storyline.

Spin-offs

Soulcalibur Legends 

Released in 2007 for the Wii, Soulcalibur Legends is the series' first spin-off title. Departing from the usual fighting game genre, it is an action-adventure game with elements of hack and slash, in which the player controls one out of the game's seven playable characters through a level infested with enemies and defeats the boss in the end. It features competitive and cooperative gameplay in addition to the single-player mode. Soulcalibur Legends, although set between the events of Soul Edge and Soulcalibur, is non-canon to the series.

Soulcalibur: Broken Destiny 

Released in 2009 for the Sony PSP, Soulcalibur: Broken Destiny is the first portable installment of the Soulcalibur series. It uses many of the features used in Soulcalibur IV, such as the soul crush, armor destruction, critical finishers, and Character Creation, and also brings in some new features such as new lighting effects for stages that correspond to different times of day, and the new Gauntlet Story mode. The game's features are similar to Soulcalibur IV, including its customization features, but it introduced a new character named Dampierre, a conman who wears twin blades on his wrists. In addition, Kratos from the God of War franchise appears as a guest character. Broken Destiny received very positive reviews.

Soulcalibur: Lost Swords 

Released in 2014, Soulcalibur: Lost Swords is a free-to-play video game distributed through the PlayStation Network. It is a strictly single-player game based on Soulcalibur V in which the goal is for the player to collect loot, including raw materials and weapons, through battles in the new Quest Mode.

Soulcalibur: Unbreakable Soul 
Initially trademarked by Bandai Namco in October 2013, Soulcalibur: Unbreakable Soul was announced on Bandai Namco's Global Gamer's Day 2014 for the mobile phones, the first installment made specifically for the platform, this time iOS (the previous mobile game was an Android port of Soulcalibur). Released on May 8, 2014, Unbreakable Soul is a card-based fighting game where players can pick different attack cards to strike enemies. Elemental system makes a return from Soulcalibur: Lost Swords; players can mix the cards with one of the five elements: fire, water, wind, light, and dark. There are over 200 weapons as well as more than 150 player avatars featured. The game's story revolves around Cassandra and Edge Master in their efforts to find the fragments of Soul Edge. Unbreakable Soul received unfavorable reviews.

Gameplay 
All the games in the Soulcalibur series retain some specific features while others features vary from game to game. The basic button layout for the series launches two weapon attacks (horizontally and vertically aligned strikes), a kick button, and a guard button for blocking. Two features that have been kept in the series since its inception are the Guard Impact defense system and the Ring Out condition of victory.

In the first game (Soul Edge/Blade), the Guard Impact system is a repelling technique that allows the player to check an incoming strike and push it back to allow a free hit. A Guard Impact requires precise timing (with the player pressing forward and guarding at the instant an opponent strikes) but it results in tactical advantage for the defender. The opposing player is able to counter a Guard Impact with their own and this can result in a stalemate until one of the players misjudges the timing on a subsequent Guard Impact. As the series progressed, the Guard Impact system was developed further. In Soulcalibur, Namco introduced new Guard Impact techniques: Parry and Weapon Strip, while the original repelling technique was renamed Repelling. These different Guard Impact types have been kept in subsequent installments of the game. In the fifth game, Guard Impacts were slightly altered by giving the Parry maneuver the new property of slamming opponents to the ground rather than just easing their weapon off course. Repels still work in the same way as they have in previous Soulcalibur series games.

Ring Outs occur when one of the fighters is forcibly removed from the game's arena (or ring), instantly ending the round and resulting in a round point for their opponent. The idea of Ring Outs in 3D fighting games was originally conceived by the Virtua Fighter series of fighting games and adopted by Namco for Soul Edge. A combatant cannot be knocked out of the ring without being eliminated by some effort from themselves or by their opponent. Later games introduced new ring designs that modified the way Ring Outs were handled (Soulcalibur allowed rings to take different shapes instead of a basic square, Soulcalibur II introduced stages with walls that blocked off parts of the ring and made Ring Outs possible only in certain parts of the stage or removing that condition altogether, and Soulcalibur III introduced low walls that can be destroyed to create a Ring Out opportunity). Soulcalibur V introduced a new aspect of Ring Outs; if a Ring Out is declared on certain stages, the battle will continue in a new location that is below the point where the Ring Out occurred. V also includes infinite stages (the stages have no edges of any kind, allowing the battle to continue in any direction with no limit) for the first time in the history of the series.

Soul Edge is unique in the series as it is the only game to feature the Weapon Meter; a sword-shaped meter under the characters' vitality bars that determined how much damage a weapon could sustain. As a character blocked attacks; the meter would deplete until it emptied which resulted in a weapon breaking (the player would also have to pay half the Weapon Meter to perform a Critical Edge combo). Once the character's weapon was broken, they were forced to fight bare-handed until the end of the round. The Weapon Meter was designed to promote consistent offense and deter constant defense (other fighters have adopted similar means to deter over-defending; Street Fighter Alpha 3s Guard Meter is an example of such a device). The Weapon Meter was abandoned following Soul Edge and instead replaced with Soulcaliburs trademark 8-Way Run system. The 8-Way Run allowed players to walk in any direction at any time instead of using a specific command to sidestep. This kept the fights truly three-dimensional and made it easier to maneuver around attacks or away from ring edges (as well as launch specific 8-Way Run attacks). Each of the sequels to Soulcalibur has used the 8-Way Run movement system.

In Soulcalibur IV, Namco introduced a new variation of the Critical Edge combo, called the Critical Finish. Rather than being a combo, a Critical Finish is more of a finishing move which involves an elaborate move that defeats opponents in a single attack. This new attack is tied to the Soul Gauge that works similarly to the Guard Break meter in Street Fighter Alpha 3 (the meter decreases whenever the player blocks an attack and is replenished by landing attacks on the opponent, it also refills slowly over time). Also tied to the Soul Gauge is the concept of destructible character armor (akin to Fighting Vipers) that can be smashed off characters to weaken their resistance to attacks. The Critical Finish itself replaces the Soul Charge from the other three Soulcalibur games (a supercharge-like move that can give a character counter properties for the duration of its charge).

Large gameplay changes have been implemented for Soulcalibur V. Critical Finishes are no longer part of the gameplay, being replaced by the Critical Edge (a different attack from that used in Soul Blade). Critical Edge attacks can be used after filling up the new Critical Gauge, which works similarly to "super meters" in other fighting games. Guard Impacts are now tied to this gauge (a segment must be sacrificed to execute one) and the original Guard Impact mechanic is replaced by Just Guard, which works similarly but removes the consequence for missed timing. The Critical Gauge can also be used for Brave Edge attacks, which are stronger attacks than regular ones that don't require an entire bar. In addition to the 8-Way Run, Quick Step allows players to execute a faster sidestep to circle their opponent.

Plot 
A long time ago, an ordinary sword was soaked with blood through the endless battles of its era, causing the sword to be corrupted and becoming sentient by its own, which earned it the name "Soul Edge". No one dared to wield the sword without getting corrupted by its evil spirit, and only the Hero King, Algol can wield it without getting possessed. However, Algol's son, jealous of his father's feat, wielded the sword and became corrupted. Algol destroyed both his son and the sword, from which he then made a weapon in grief, naming it "Soul Calibur". He was sacrificed to complete the sword's ritual which would then be protected by a cult; no one knew that Soul Edge would reform on its own later on. Soul Calibur itself was lost after it was stolen by a member of the cult, Zasalamel.

In 1553, a Spanish pirate, Cervantes de Leon stole Soul Edge from a dealer's ship, but gradually became corrupted by its spirit until it devoured his soul, influencing him to terrorize the world for over twenty years. This terror made several warriors to venture out and stop him, including a female ninja, Taki, who wanted to destroy Soul Edge for having corrupted her master, and a German rebel, Siegfried Schtauffen, who desperately wanted to blame someone for his accidental murder of his father. Eventually, a Greek warrior, Sophitia Alexandra, confronted and managed to destroy one of Cervantes' blades, but the battle was eventually ended by Taki, who managed to slay Cervantes. Siegfried then came to check Soul Edge, but he became possessed by the release of the "Evil Seed" and turned into the monstrous Nightmare. The Evil Seed event had major impact to the world, including several people going insane, and Nightmare replaced Cervantes in terrorizing the world, wanting to recover the lost Soul Edge fragments. Three years later, Nightmare had prepared for the ritual to complete Soul Edge, but three warriors from Asia, Chai Xianghua, Kilik, and Maxi stormed his castle, the Ostrheinsburg, and managed to defeat Nightmare, with Soul Edge's spirit (Inferno) being shattered by Xianghua's blade, which was revealed to be the lost Soul Calibur. Though Siegfried temporarily regained his sanity, he became possessed again shortly after, as did Soul Calibur, which succumbed to the darkness of Inferno.

Four years later, Nightmare had begun on his Soul Edge ritual again in his old castle, wanting to resurrect Soul Edge, but his ritual was interrupted by an exiled French nobleman, Raphael Sorel, who wanted Soul Edge in order to get revenge on the French nobles who exiled him. Although Raphael was utterly defeated, he was able to penetrate Soul Edge, which gave Siegfried and Soul Calibur the time to break free of its control fully. Soul Edge was then pierced by Siegfried using Soul Calibur, trapping them in the "Soul Embrace". While things seemed to go normal afterwards, Zasalamel had returned to try and free both swords, intending to use their power to break his cycle of reincarnation induced by Soul Calibur. He managed to do so, and Inferno took a physical form to become the "second Nightmare". Siegfried clashed with this new Nightmare, but was wounded in the process and had to be healed by Soul Calibur, tying him with it permanently, while Soul Edge was cast to the void to heal itself. The clash of Soul Edge and Soul Calibur had awakened Algol from his slumber, who rose the Tower of Remembrance to wait for warriors to challenge him. Meanwhile, Nightmare, with his servant Tira, wanting to gather the Soul Edge fragments to complete Soul Edge, forced several warriors, including Astaroth, Sophitia, and Voldo into servitude, while Siegfried, having recovered, set out to confront Nightmare. The two clashed for the second time in the Tower of Remembrance, where Siegfried managed to destroy both Nightmare and Soul Edge, seemingly once and for all.

Seventeen years later, however, Soul Edge had reformed itself, as did Nightmare, who had possessed a swordsman and became the king of Hungary under the alias "Graf Dumas". His former servant, Tira, did not accept him and intended to search for a new vessel for Soul Edge. She eventually found her now-dead nemesis Sophitia's daughter, Pyrrha Alexandra, whom she had once kidnapped to blackmail Sophitia, who had Soul Edge's power in her blood. Though successful in advising her to attack and kill the people who had ostracized her, Tira was confronted by Pyrrha's long-lost brother, Patroklos Alexander, formerly a warrior under Graf Dumas, who had made his life's goal to find his sister and avenge his mother's murder. While he was able to bring her back, they were confronted by Nightmare and Pyrrha awakened her Soul Edge powers. She was disappointed when Patroklos was hesitant in accepting her, and decided to follow Tira again. Patroklos was named as Soul Calibur's new wielder afterwards by Siegfried and also purified the holy sword through the help of several Asian warriors, before going on an all-out battle in Europe. Nightmare was eventually killed by Siegfried's subordinate, Z.W.E.I., who was immediately wounded by the possessed Pyrrha, who proceeded to battle Patroklos. Patroklos accidentally killed his sister, but was given a second chance by Edge Master to purify Pyrrha without killing her. However, Patroklos was trapped subconsciously to fight Soul Calibur's spirit, Elysium, the one who had guided him all this time, as she was angry at him for sparing his malfested sister. After defeating Elysium, he alongside Pyrrha pierced Soul Calibur with Soul Edge, after which he accepted to live with his sister regardless of who she is.

In a parallel timeline, the events after 1583 have been altered. While traveling to Ostrheinsburg to confront Nightmare, Kilik and his companions were aided by Grøh of the Aval Organization, a group created by the late King Arthur to use Soul Calibur to defeat Soul Edge. A few characters have learned of the dark future that was to come, and have started to work on changing that future. Zasalamel received a warning from his future counterpart of the mistakes that he would make, and decided to be a leader for mankind instead of seeking for a permanent death. Cassandra Alexandra, younger sister of the holy warrior Sophitia, was given a warning by her original timeline counterpart, who had been stuck inside the Astral Chaos and became malfested. The warning was about Sophitia's death and Pyrrha's malfestation in the future, and the new Cassandra set off to prevent the tragic fate of her family. Meanwhile, Azwel, who had been a member of the Aval Organization but betrayed them, set about to create the “Ultimate Seed,” which was similar to the original Evil Seed. But his plans were thwarted by the Conduit, a warrior who had the power to absorb astral fissures and who was aided by Grøh. But the Conduit later had to fight Grøh, who had succumbed to his malfestation. The Conduit will either kill or spare Grøh, depending on their actions from their journey.

Characters 

The Soul series features a wide variety of characters hailing from various countries, backgrounds, and disciplines. Most characters typically have their own reasons in partaking their journey, although they frequently meet and interact with each other and most also share a common goal; finding either the cursed sword Soul Edge or its holy counterpart, Soul Calibur. As the game is set in the late 16th century, many real-life events happening during the timeline often influence the story, one example being Oda Nobunaga as the initiator for Yoshimitsu's journey to find Soul Edge.

Out of all the characters in the series, four characters have appeared in all nine games so far: Cervantes, Mitsurugi, Siegfried and Nightmare, the latter two making one appearance each as an alternate costume to each other. Four characters: Astaroth, Ivy, Sophitia, and Taki have come close, appearing in eight games. Other characters who do not appear often make cameos or are commented upon in-game. While continuously being revised in each game, the character lineup generally stay consistent until Soulcalibur V, in which a major time skip is done and the character roster undergoing major changes, with former mainstays being replaced by their younger successors.

The series is notable for its inclusion of characters from other series appearing as guests. Since Soulcalibur II, every sequent game have hosted guest characters, usually from other Namco franchises, although more recent games have branched into titles developed by other companies, such as The Legend of Zelda, Spawn, Star Wars, God of War, Assassin's Creed and The Witcher. The guests, though, can only appear in one game due to licensing. Guest characters who have appeared in the series include Heihachi Mishima, Devil Jin, King, Ling Xiaoyu, Asuka Kazama, and Jun Kazama from Tekken (the latter five as attires for custom characters), Link from The Legend of Zelda, Spawn from Spawn, Lloyd Irving from Tales of Symphonia, KOS-MOS from Xenosaga (as an attire for custom characters), Darth Vader, Yoda, and The Apprentice from Star Wars, Kratos from God of War, Ezio Auditore da Firenze from Assassin's Creed, Geralt of Rivia from The Witcher, 2B from NieR: Automata and Haohmaru from Samurai Shodown. Other than featuring characters from other series, the series' characters have also appeared in other video games as well, including the Ridge Racer series, Pac-Man Fever, Smash Court Tennis Pro Tournament 2, Queen's Gate: Spiral Chaos, Musou Orochi 2 Ultimate, as well as crossover titles such as Namco × Capcom and Project X Zone 2.

Other media

Books 
A five-volume manhua based on Soulcalibur (劍魂 Jiànhún lit. translation 'Soul of Sword''') was published in 1999 by author Mó yì (魔翼) and was published by Qingwen (青文). A separate two volume manhua titled Soulcalibur: Spirit Sword (靈神劍, Ling Shenjian, lit. translation: Spirit Holy Sword) was released in 1998 that retold the events of the first game but with Hwang as the central character in a setting with Sci-Fi elements. A two-volume novelization was written by Tobita Mandom (supervised by Project Soul), illustrated by JUNNY, and published by Shueisha in Japan in 2012. Several guide and art books were published in Japan for various installments of the series by Namco, Enterbrain, Gamest, Nintendo and V Jump.

 Soundtracks 

Two soundtrack albums were released for Soul Edge, and one album for each of Soulcalibur, II, III, IV, V and VI.

 Traditional games Soulcalibur series characters were featured in the 2006 collectible card game Universal Fighting System. Taki and Ivy were also the subject of a 2011 erotic gamebook in the Queen's Gate series. Pyrrah was later included.

 Film adaptation project 
During spring 2001, the martial arts film star Sammo Hung announced plans for a film adaptation of Soulcalibur entitled Soul Calibur: The Movie. The film was to be directed by Hung and would be produced by Alan Noel Vega, Michael Cerenzie, Sam Kute and Joseph Jones. According to a statement posted on his website, the film budget would need to be $50 million, locations were to include Eastern Europe and China, and the special effects would be done by Rhythm and Hues Studios because of their relationship with Namco. In 2004, Warren Zide's Sony-owned Anthem Pictures acquired the rights to adapt the game to film, which would be produced by Matthew Rhodes and Noel Vega and released in 2007. It has been stated that the film's plot "revolves around two warriors who are chosen by Shaolin monks to recover and destroy a powerful sword that has fallen into the hands of an evil prince who plans to use it to open the gates of hell and destroy the world." The now-defunct teaser website for the film (soulcaliburthemovie.com) contained a citation from Nostradamus. The film remains in development hell.

 Reception 

The Soulcalibur series is a successful fighting game franchise. As of 2012, the Soulcalibur'' series had sold more than 13 million units worldwide, with that number, as of 2018, rising to more than 15 million. As of July 2021 the series has crossed over 17 million units of game worldwide. The series has been rated favorably for the majority of its main series titles.

References

External links 

 

 
Bandai Namco Entertainment franchises
Video games about ninja
Fighting video games by series
Video game franchises
Video game franchises introduced in 1995
Cultural depictions of Oda Nobunaga